Abdul Hameed Adam (1910–1981) was a Pakistani writer and poet.

Early life and education
Abdul Hameed was born in Talwandi Musa, a village in Gujranwala area, Punjab, British India (now in Punjab, Pakistan).

He had completed his early education at home and completed his matriculation (10th grade) from Islamia High School, Bhati gate, Lahore, Pakistan. After completing FA (the 12th grade) as a private student, Adam started working for the Indian Army in 1927–1928 and worked there until Second world war started.

Personal life and marriages
During the Second world war, he was sent to the Middle East, where he served in Iran and Iraq. In Iraq, he fell in love with an Iraqi girl, got married with her as his second wife, and brought her back with him to India after the end of the Second world war. On his return to India, he was posted to Pune (Poona, Maharashtra, India) where he became excessively involved with some friends and started drinking heavily. He would come home very late at night and then his disputes started with his Iraqi second wife. This second wife soon returned to Iraq and thereafter Adam remained loyal to his first local wife till she died in 1978/1979.

He was transferred to Rawalpindi after the establishment of Pakistan in 1947. In 1948, he was appointed Deputy Assistant Controller of Military Accounts and later retired from this position in April 1966. By 1978/1979 Abdul Hameed Adam had himself become chronically ill. He died in 1981.

Bibliography 
 Kharabaat
 Jhoot-sach (1972)
 Ramm-e-Aahu
 Barbat-o-Jaam
 Nadaniyan
 Charah-e-Dard
 Chaak Pairhan
 Dastoor-e-Wafa
 Nisaab e Dil
 Daulat e Bedaar

References

External links 
 Poetry of Abdul Hameed Adam

1910 births
1981 deaths
People from Gujranwala
20th-century Pakistani poets
Urdu-language poets from Pakistan